The 2022 Belgian Darts Open was the twelfth of thirteen PDC European Tour events on the 2022 PDC Pro Tour. The tournament took place at the Oktoberhallen, Wieze, Belgium, from 23–25 September 2022. It featured a field of 48 players and £140,000 in prize money, with £25,000 going to the winner.

Dave Chisnall won his third European tour title, beating Andrew Gilding 8–6 in the final. He also hit the first European Tour nine-darter for three years in his semi-final win over Danny Noppert.

Prize money
The prize money was unchanged from the European Tours of the last 3 years:

 Seeded players who lose in the second round and host nation qualifiers (who qualify automatically as a result of their ranking) who lose in their first match of the event shall not be credited with prize money on any Order of Merit. A player who qualifies as a qualifier, but later becomes a seed due to the withdrawal of one or more other players shall be credited with their prize money on all Orders of Merit regardless of how far they progress in the event.

Qualification and format
The top 16 entrants from the PDC ProTour Order of Merit on 26 July automatically qualified for the event and were seeded in the second round.

The remaining 32 places went to players from six qualifying events – 24 from the Tour Card Holder Qualifier (held on 2 August), two from the Associate Member Qualifier (held on 27 August), the two highest ProTour ranking Belgian players, two from the Host Nation Qualifier (held on 22 September), one from the Nordic & Baltic Associate Member Qualifier (held on 29 July), and one from the East European Associate Member Qualifier (held on 26 June).

Luke Humphries, Gerwyn Price and Michael Smith withdrew as seeds prior to the draw, meaning Martin Schindler, Gabriel Clemens and Adrian Lewis were promoted into seeded positions and three extra places were made available in the Host Nation Qualifier.

The following players took part in the tournament:

Top 16
  (second round)
  (third round)
  (second round)
  (third round)
  (third round)
  (second round)
  (third round)
  (third round)
  (semi-finals)
  (semi-finals)
  (second round)
  (quarter-finals)
  (winner)
  (quarter-finals)
  (quarter-finals)
  (quarter-finals)

Tour Card Qualifier
  (first round)
  (first round)
  (second round)
  (third round)
  (second round)
  (third round)
  (first round)
  (first round)
  (second round)
  (second round)
  (first round)
  (runner-up)
  (second round)
  (first round)
  (first round)
  (first round)
  (second round)
  (first round)
  (second round)
  (second round)
  (first round)

Associate Member Qualifier
  (first round)
  (second round)

Highest Ranked Belgians
  (third round)
  (second round)

Host Nation Qualifier
  (first round)
  (first round)
  (first round)
  (first round)
  (first round)

Nordic & Baltic Qualifier
  (second round)

East European Qualifier
  (second round)

Draw

Notes

References

2022 PDC Pro Tour
2022 PDC European Tour
2022 in Belgian sport
September 2022 sports events in Belgium